In Greek mythology, Spartoi  (also Sparti or Spartae) (Ancient Greek: Σπαρτοί, literal translation: "sown [men]", from σπείρω, speírō, "to sow") are a mythical people who sprang up from the dragon's teeth sown by Cadmus and were believed to be the ancestors of the Theban nobility.

Mythology

Thebes
Cadmus arrived in Thebes, Greece, after following a cow at the urging of the oracle at Delphi, who instructed him to found a city wherever the cow should stop. Cadmus, wishing to sacrifice the cow, sent his men to a nearby spring to fetch water. The spring was guarded by the Ismenian dragon, who slew many of the men before Cadmus killed it with his sword.

According to the Bibliotheca, the dragon was sacred to Ares. Athena gave Cadmus half of the dragon's teeth, advising him to sow them. When he did, fierce armed men sprang up from the furrows. Cadmus threw a stone among them because he feared them, and they, thinking that the stone had been thrown by one of the others, fought each other until only five of them remained: Echion (future father of Pentheus), Udaeus, Chthonius, Hyperenor and Pelorus. These five helped Cadmus to found the city of Thebes, but Cadmus was forced to be a slave to Ares for eight years to atone for killing the dragon. At the end of the year, he was given Harmonia, the daughter of Aphrodite and Ares, to be his wife.

However, Hellanicus writes that only five Spartoi sprang up, omitting the battle between them. In his version, Zeus had to intervene to save Cadmus from the anger of Ares, who wished to kill him. Echion later married Agave, the daughter of Cadmus, and their son Pentheus succeeded Cadmus as king.

Colchis
The other half of the dragon's teeth were planted by Jason at Colchis. Aeetes, the king of Colchis, had been given the teeth by Athena, and he forced Jason to sow them in order to win the golden fleece. Like Cadmus, Jason threw a stone among the Spartoi to confuse them. The Spartoi then began to fight each other over the stone. Only five survived, who then assisted to build the Cadmea (citadel) of Thebes.

Modern influence

In modern Swedish, the Spartoi as they appeared in the story of Jason has inspired the idiom "draksådd" (dragon-seed) with the meaning of spreading corrupting ideas, or in the broader sense, actions with dire consequences.

See also 
 Greek mythology in popular culture
 Jason of Spartax, a fictional character from Marvel Comics' Guardians of the Galaxy whose civilisation is based on its mythological Greek counterpart.

Notes

References
 Apollodorus, The Library with an English Translation by Sir James George Frazer, F.B.A., F.R.S. in 2 Volumes, Cambridge, MA, Harvard University Press; London, William Heinemann Ltd. 1921. ISBN 0-674-99135-4. Online version at the Perseus Digital Library. Greek text available from the same website.
 Gantz, Timothy, Early Greek Myth: A Guide to Literary and Artistic Sources, Johns Hopkins University Press, 1996, Two volumes:  (Vol. 1),  (Vol. 2).
Pausanias, Description of Greece with an English Translation by W.H.S. Jones, Litt.D., and H.A. Ormerod, M.A., in 4 Volumes. Cambridge, MA, Harvard University Press; London, William Heinemann Ltd. 1918. . Online version at the Perseus Digital Library
Pausanias, Graeciae Descriptio. 3 vols. Leipzig, Teubner. 1903.  Greek text available at the Perseus Digital Library.
Smith, William; Dictionary of Greek and Roman Biography and Mythology, London (1873). "Sparti"

Autochthons of classical mythology
Children of Ares
Argonautica
Deeds of Ares
Theban characters in Greek mythology
Ancient tribes in Boeotia
Legendary tribes in Greco-Roman historiography
Greek tribes
Metamorphoses into humanoids in Greek mythology